Otanthus is a genus of flowering plants in the chamomile tribe (Anthemideae) within the daisy family (Asteraceae or Compositae). The only known species is the cotton weed plant, Otanthus maritimus. It is a small pioneering perennial that grows in the dune areas throughout the Mediterranean and exerts a stabilizing action on the sandy soils. A thick white down covers both the stems and the small oval, slightly saw-toothed alternate leaves. The globose flower heads, with their short peduncles, are composed of an envelope of white-wooly scales around tubular yellow flowers that are visible from June through to September. The generic name is derived from the Greek words otos (ear) and anthos (flower). This refers to the form of the corolla, which is composed of three membranous bracts that create a profile similar to that of a human ear.

See also
 List of extinct plants of the British Isles

References

External links

Monotypic Asteraceae genera
Anthemideae